Battus polystictus is a species of butterfly from the family Papilionidae that is found in Brazil, Paraguay, Uruguay and Argentina. Male and female are less dimorphic than in related species as regards wing shape and pattern, but the male has a prominent pale yellow lengthwise stripe on the upperside of its abdomen.

The larvae feed on Aristolochia brasiliensis, Aristolochia fimbriata and Aristolochia triangularis.

Subspecies
Battus polystictus polystictus (Brazil: Paraná, Santa Catarina, Rio Grande do Sul, Paraguay, Uruguay, Argentina: Misiones, Corrientes to Buenos Aires) Möhn, 1999, Butterflies of the World 5: 7, plate 9, figures 1-4, plate 19, figures 1-2.
Battus polystictus galenus (Fruhstorfer, 1907) (Brazil: Minas Gerais, São Paulo, Espirito Santo, Rio de Janeiro) Möhn, 1999, Butterflies of the World 5: 7, plate 9, figures 5-6.

References

Lewis, H. L., 1974 Butterflies of the World  Page 23, figure 4.

polystictus
Papilionidae of South America
Lepidoptera of Brazil
Butterflies described in 1874
Taxa named by Arthur Gardiner Butler